Hygge is a word in Danish and Norwegian that describes a mood of coziness and "comfortable conviviality" with feelings of wellness and contentment. As a cultural category with its sets of associated practices hygge has more or less the same meaning in both places and in both languages; however, the emphasis on hygge as a core part of Danish culture is a recent phenomenon, dating to the late 20th century.

Etymology 
The word hygge comes from a Danish word meaning "to give courage, comfort, joy". Hygge is built from the Old Norse word  which later became the hug which means the soul, mind, consciousness.

But it is also speculated that hygge might originate from the word hug. Hug comes from the 1560s word hugge, which means "to embrace". The word hugge is of unknown origin but is highly associated with an Old Norse term, which means "to comfort", which comes from the word , meaning "mood". In turn, the word comes from the Germanic word hugyan, which is a cognate of the Old English , meaning "to think, consider".

It first appeared in Danish writing in the 19th century and has since evolved into the cultural idea known in Denmark and Norway today. While hygge has exactly the same meaning in Norwegian as in Danish and is a widely used word in both Norway and Denmark (including in its derived forms, such as hyggelig), the emphasis specifically on "hygge" as an important part of their cultural identity is mostly a recent Danish phenomenon; in Norway "hygge" is just a word, similar in status to "cosy" in English-speaking countries or "cozy" in the US.

Use 
In both Danish and Norwegian, hygge refers to "a form of everyday togetherness", "a pleasant and highly valued everyday experience of safety, equality, personal wholeness and a spontaneous social flow".

The noun hygge includes something nice, cozy, safe and known, referring to a psychological state. The Happiness Research Institute in Copenhagen has studied the positive effect of "hygge" on Danish society.

Collins English Dictionary defines the word as "a concept, originating in Denmark, of creating cosy and convivial atmospheres that promote wellbeing".

In popular culture 

Collins English Dictionary named hygge the runner-up (after "Brexit") as word of the year in the UK in 2016. This followed a period during which several books focusing on hygge had been marketed in the UK, such as The Little Book of Hygge by Meik Wiking, Hygge: The Danish Art of Happiness by Marie Tourell Søderberg, and The Book of Hygge: The Danish Art of Living Well by Louisa Thomsen Brits.

The concept of Hygge gained popularity with an international audience in late 2017, resulting in an increase of online searches and the rise of the hashtag "#Hygge" on Instagram.

In Copenhagen, the capital of Denmark, there is a Hygge & Happiness walking tour.

Act II of the Broadway musical Frozen opens with the song "Hygge", which is all about being comfortable, happy, and together.

In the Australian soap opera Neighbours, Jemima Davies-Smythe incorporates hygge into a redesign of her half-brother Karl Kennedy's living room.

A UK housing development in the town of Keynsham, Somerset, was named "Hygge Park" by developer Crest Nicholson in 2019.

Swedish-owned ferry company Stena Line offers a series of premium relaxation lounges on its Irish Sea ferry services called "Hygge Lounges". In November 2020, The Hygge Suite brand of vacation rentals opened in Giants Ridge, Minnesota; and later two more in Lutsen, Minnesota, aimed at getting people away from the cities to relax and unwind with their loved ones. In September 2022, Hotel Hygge opened in Buellton, California.

Due to autumn and winter traditions such as pie, yuletide, sweaters, hot cocoa, soup, and apple cider, winter and autumn can be thought to be the sole seasons of hygge. However, moments of hygge happen throughout the year, including the summer. Examples of hot-weather outdoor activities considered hygge include picnics, barbecues, concerts, street fairs and cycling.

The second episode of the second series of BBC sitcom Motherland, "Soft Opening", saw Amanda open a concept store called "Hygge Tygge" which, unbeknown to her, means "cosy chewing" in Danish.

The Ghost and Molly McGee episode "Ready, Set, Snow" sees Molly trying to get the most out of a snow day while her family and Libby stay inside to experience "hygee".

Similar words 
 The Dutch words gezellig and gezelligheid have a similar concept to hygge, also pertaining to comfort and cosiness, but the Dutch words are often more socially oriented.
 In German Gemütlichkeit means the state of warmth, friendliness and belonging.
 The Norwegian adjective koselig is used to describe a feeling of warmth, intimacy and getting together in an agreeable environment.
 The Swedish adjective mysig (and its associated noun mys) describes a pleasant and warm atmosphere of togetherness in a pleasant setting.
 The Japanese adjective/verb まったり (mattari) suggests a feeling of calm relaxation.

See also 
 Happiness
 Safety

References

External links

The Guardian: The hygge conspiracy

Feeling
Pleasure
Happiness
Emotion
Danish culture
Norwegian culture
Danish words and phrases
Norwegian words and phrases
Words and phrases with no direct English translation
Sociological terminology
Mental states